Estadio Municipal de Linarejos is a stadium in Linares, Spain.  It is currently used for football matches and was the home stadium of Linares Deportivo.  The stadium holds 10,000 spectators.

References

External links
Stadium information
Estadios de España 

Linarejos
Buildings and structures in the Province of Jaén (Spain)
Sports venues completed in 1955